Niphoparmena obliquefasciata is a species of beetle in the family Cerambycidae. It was described by Stephan von Breuning in 1939.

References

obliquefasciata
Beetles described in 1939
Taxa named by Stephan von Breuning (entomologist)